Mary Ellen Kimball [Purdham] (born April 1, 1929) is a former All-American Girls Professional Baseball League player. Listed at 5' 7 ", 148 lb., she batted and threw right handed.

Born in Kalamazoo, Michigan, Mary Ellen Kimball joined the league with the Racine Belles club in its 1948 season, but did not have much playing time. She was signed as an outfielder and Racine later tried to turn her into a pitcher. In a two-game career, she went hitless in five at bats and did not have a pitching record. She later married and moved to Irons, Michigan.

The All-American Girls Professional Baseball League folded in 1954, but there is a permanent display at the Baseball Hall of Fame and Museum at Cooperstown, New York since November 5, 1988, that honors the entire league rather than any individual figure.

Sources

1929 births
Living people
All-American Girls Professional Baseball League players
Racine Belles (1943–1950) players
Baseball players from Michigan
People from Kalamazoo, Michigan
People from Lake County, Michigan